Canistrum guzmanioides is a parent species in the genus Canistrum. This species is endemic to Brazil.

References

guzmanioides
Flora of Brazil